Patrick Dun (1580–1652) was a Scottish scholar who was principal of Marischal College from 1621 to 1649. Marischal College is now known as Aberdeen University.

Life
He was born in Aberdeen the son of Andrew Dun, a city burgess. He was educated at Aberdeen Grammar School and at the newly created Marischal College under Robert Howie. He went to Switzerland and received a doctorate in medicine (MD) at the University of Basel in 1601 then obtained a post as professor at Helmstedt 1603/4.

He returned to Aberdeen in 1610 and took the position as Professor of Physic at King's College, Aberdeen becoming Rector in 1619. In 1621 he succeeded William Forbes as Principal of Marischal College. When the college was damaged by fire in 1639 Dun personally contributed to the cost of rebuilding.

In 1629 he purchased the estate of Ferryhill, just south of Aberdeen and was thereafter referred to "Patrick Dun of Ferryhill".

He resigned in 1649 and died in 1652. His position as principal was filled by William Moir. He bequeathed the Ferryhill estate to the city of Aberdeen.

Publications
Themata Medica de Dolore Colico (1607)
Editing of Duncan Liddel's Ars Conservandi Sanitatem (1651)

Artistic recognition
He was portrayed by George Jamesone around 1630 and the portrait originally hung at Aberdeen Grammar School but is now held by Aberdeen Art Gallery.

Family
Dun was uncle of Patrick Dun who rose to fame in Ireland.

References

1580 births
1652 deaths
People from Aberdeen
Academics of the University of Aberdeen